Kangal is a town and a district of Sivas Province in Turkey. The current mayor is Ahmet Kürşad Apaydın from the Great Unity Party (BBP). As Kaymakam was appointed Erinç Demir.

Demographics 
The town is populated by Sunni Kurds and Sunni Turks. The district is also home to both Alevi Kurds and Alevi Turks.

Notable people
Hüseyin Alp (1935–1983) basketball player and actor

See also
Kangal dog
Deliktaş Tunnel, Turkey's longest railway tunnel near Deliktaş, Kangal
Kuzyaka

References

 
Populated places in Sivas Province
Towns in Turkey